For the physics concept, see .
Mechanical power is a medical term which is a measure of the amount of energy imparted to a patient by a mechanical ventilator.

While in many cases mechanical ventilation is a life-saving or life-preserving intervention, it also has the potential to cause harm to the patient via ventilator-associated lung injury. A number of stresses may be induced by the ventilator on the patient's lung. These include barotrauma caused by pressure, volutrauma caused by distension of the lungs, rheotrauma caused by fast-flowing delivery of gases and atelectotrauma resulting from repeated collapse and re-opening of the lung.

The purpose of mechanical power is to provide a quantity which can account for all of these stresses and therefore predict the amount of lung injury which is likely to be seen in the patient.

References

Respiratory therapy
Pulmonology
Emergency medicine
Medical equipment
Intensive care medicine
Lung disorders

There is no agreed upon equation for Mechanical Power.